Hohepa "Hep" Cahill (born 15 October 1986) is a New Zealand former professional rugby league footballer who played as a  or  in the 2000s and 2010s.

He played for the Melbourne Storm in the NRL, and Crusaders RL in the Super League. Cahill also played for the Widnes Vikings in the Super League and the Betfred Championship.

Background
Cahill was born in Hastings, New Zealand.

Playing career
Cahill went to Napier Boys' College in New Zealand, and is also a former age grade New Zealand kick boxing champion.

Cahill signed with Melbourne Storm in 2009. He made his NRL début in Round 20, 2009.

He played in the 2010 World Club Challenge against Leeds, being part of the team that lifted the trophy.

On Friday 17 February 2012, Widnes announced they had suspended Scott Moore, Hep Cahill and Simon Finnigan for an unspecified breach of club discipline, so missing the match against Salford on Sunday 19 February 2012.

References

External links
Widnes Vikings profile
SL profile

1986 births
Living people
New Zealand rugby league players
New Zealand Māori rugby league team players
New Zealand expatriate sportspeople in England
Expatriate sportspeople in Australia
Crusaders Rugby League players
Melbourne Storm players
Rugby league second-rows
Rugby league players from Napier, New Zealand
Widnes Vikings players